Lotophila is a genus of flies belonging to the family lesser dung flies.

Species
L. atra (Meigen, 1830)
L. nepalensis Hayashi, 1991
L. vietnamica Hayashi, 2003

References

Sphaeroceridae
Sphaeroceroidea genera
Muscomorph flies of Europe